East of Everything is an Australian drama television drama series set in the Northern Rivers region of New South Wales which screened in 2008-2009 on the Australian Broadcasting Corporation (ABC) television network.  It was produced by Deb Cox (SeaChange), Fiona Eagger (CrashBurn) and Roger Monk (The Secret Life of Us). Two seasons were produced. In addition to its principal themes of families, relationships, values and small-town politics, the series pays homage to the relaxed beach lifestyle, adjacent rainforest, "hippy vibe", and potential conflicts with developers associated with its principal setting, a somewhat downmarket version of the tourist town of Byron Bay on the northern New South Wales coast.

Synopsis
The story initially revolves around Art Watkins (Richard Roxburgh), a globe-trotting travel writer who returns home for his mother's funeral to a neglected resort town, Broken Bay, on the easternmost point of Australia, where he is challenged by a crooked local council, his brother Vance who is trying to cheat him out of his inheritance, his first love who broke his heart when he was a teenager and the son he hasn't seen in ten years. As the series progresses, the life journeys of additional characters are interwoven, including (in season 2) the unexpected return of Gerry (Nick Tate), estranged father of the Watkins brothers (and original constructor of the resort). The fictional town in which the show is set is loosely based on Byron Bay, New South Wales, where the majority of filming took place, with the distinctive character of the region providing a strong supporting element. According to "The Age" writer Debi Enker, the series creators (Cox and Monk) "see their multi-generational ensemble as characters bruised by life, some seeking refuge, most requiring restoration. Reaching Broken Bay, they have come as far as they can and must turn back to face their demons, confront the problems they have endeavoured to escape." Of the two initial principal characters (the Watkins brothers), Cox says, "There's a group of men, children in the 1970s, who were left by their fathers and left wondering how to be men... Divorce became easier in the 70s and there were more family break-ups. Men grew up as small children with the breadwinner around and then became confused when their own fathers took a different path... We were kind of interested in the idea of fatherhood and brothers, and men's relationships to each other." While season 1 is mainly about the initial ensemble characters coming to terms with, and for the most part resolving some of their problems, in season 2 some new characters are introduced and, with many demons disposed of, a somewhat lighter tone is permitted to prevail, although a range of serious themes is still addressed.

The name "Broken Bay" was chosen as a combination of the names of Byron Bay and Broken Head, the next headland down the coast. In addition to Roxburgh and Tate, the series features a number of other well-known Australian actors including Tom Long, Susie Porter, Gia Carides and Steve Bisley.

Cast 
 Richard Roxburgh as Art Watkins
 Susie Porter as Eve Pritchard
 Tom Long as Vance Watkins
 Gia Carides as Melanie Freedman
 Steve Bisley as Terry Adams
 Kathryn Beck as Lizzy Dellora
 Valerie Bader as Bev Flick
 Craig Stott as Josh Watkins
 Liana Cornell as Rebecca
 Imogen Annesley as Suzy Burns
 Mouche Phillips as Sandy
 Tom Budge as Dale
 Damien Garvey as Owen
 Errol O'Neill as Len
 Glen Shea as Edgar
 Fletcher Humphrys as Jai
 Leah Vandenberg as Lara
 Tracy Mann as Rosemary de Jong (season 2)
 Nick Tate as Gerry Watkins (season 2)
 Craig Hall as Carter Smith (season 2)

Episode list

Season 1

Season 2

Detailed plot summaries for all 
episodes of both series are available here and here.

Production details
Season one had six episodes, with the show airing on Sunday nights at 8.30pm. It premiered on Sunday, 30 March 2008, and the season finale aired on Sunday, 4 May 2008. Season two has seven episodes, with the show airing on Saturday nights at 7.30pm. It premiered on Saturday, 25 July 2009. Nick Tate joined the cast for the season.

In season one, the town of Byron Bay was mostly used as the real-life analogue of the fictional Broken Bay; for season two, additional locations incorporated into the "Broken Bay" streetscape included other towns with a noted "hippy vibe" in the Northern Rivers region of northern New South Wales, notably Nimbin and Mullumbimby. The run-down, fictional Far Out East resort where much of the action is set was a specially constructed set on the site of the future Byron Beach Resort situated on Belongil Beach, Byron Bay. The inspiration for the "Far Out East" concept was stated to be in part from backpacker accommodation associated with the former Piggery site and music venue in Byron Bay, which still exists under its current (2021) name "the Arts Factory Lodge". The contribution of the soundtrack (featuring many local and generally less well-known artists) to the story and the sense of place is discussed in an article in "Screen Sound" by Liz Giuffre.

DVD and CD releases
Both seasons were released by the Australian Broadcasting Corporation on DVD for home viewing, Series 1 in 2008 and Series 2 in 2009, accompanied by various extras on each 2-disc set, while the soundtracks for both series were also available on CD. At the ARIA Music Awards of 2009 the soundtrack was nominated for ARIA Award for Best Original Soundtrack, Cast or Show Album.

See also 
 List of Australian television series
 List of Australian Broadcasting Corporation programs

References

External links 
 Series 1 official website at ABC TV (original no longer accessible; archived version as at 24 July 2008)
 Series 2 official website at ABC TV (original no longer accessible; archived version as at 6 February 2015)
 
 East of Everything Production Blog (original no longer accessible; archived version as at 6 July 2011)
 East of Everything: articles (Australian Television Information Archive)

2000s Australian drama television series
Australian Broadcasting Corporation original programming
Television shows set in New South Wales
2008 Australian television series debuts